Johannes Adrianus "Hans" Vonk (born 30 January 1970) is a retired South African professional football goalkeeper of Dutch parentage who last played for Ajax Cape Town FC.

Career

Netherlands
Vonk began his professional career at RKC Waalwijk where he made 25 appearances in three seasons. He became first-choice goal keeper for FC Wageningen, but was forced to leave after just one season, when the club went bankrupt and ceased to exist. Vonk returned to North Brabant where he played for FC Den Bosch, before joining his first club RKC, this time as their first keeper. His breakthrough came with his transfer to sc Heerenveen, a club on the rise. They reached a domestic cup final in 1996–97 and finished second in the league in 1999–2000, resulting in UEFA Champions League football the next season. After eight years, Vonk was approaching the autumn of his career. He left Heerenveen to become third-choice goalkeeper for Ajax behind Maarten Stekelenburg and Bogdan Lobonț. In a surprising turn of events, Vonk managed to play 26 games in two seasons.

First stint at South Africa
After 18 years of professional playing Vonk left the Netherlands to return to his country of birth, and played 2 seasons for Ajax' satellite club, Ajax Cape Town. He was terminated from his contract after a conflict with the coach of Ajax Cape Town, which made him a free agent.

Return to Netherlands
Ajax signed him due to injury problems with their current goalkeepers Maarten Stekelenburg and Dennis Gentenaar, leaving the Amsterdam club with only one professional goalkeeper left: Kenneth Vermeer. In the winter transfer window of 2008–09, with the regular Ajax keepers back in shape, he once again moved to an old club, Heerenveen to become second-choice goalkeeper behind Brian Vandenbussche. He soon took over Vandenbussche's spot and played several league games, and another cup final, which Heerenveen won.

Second spell at Ajax Cape Town
Continuing his tour amongst clubs he'd already played for, Vonk once again moved, this time back to his homeland South Africa, to play for Ajax Cape Town, citing family reasons, as well as sensing an opportunity to make the Bafana Bafana World Cup 2010 squad.

International 
Vonk played once for the Netherlands national under-20 football team in a 3–1 win against Denmark. He played the second half coming on as a substitute for John Karelse.

Vonk made his debut for the South African national team in May 1998 and was first choice goalkeeper for the 1998 FIFA World Cup as well as an unused substitute for Andre Arendse at the 2002 FIFA World Cup. Vonk announced his retirement for Bafana Bafana in 2005 after South Africa failed to qualify for the 2006 FIFA World Cup in Germany, after earning a total of 43 caps.

Honours

Club
Ajax
KNVB Cup: 2005–06

Ajax Cape Town
Telkom Knockout: 2008
Nedbank Cup: 2007
Mangaung Cup: 2007, 2008

Heerenveen
KNVB Cup: 2008–09

International
South Africa
Africa Cup of Nations third place: 2000

References

External links 
 Vonk signs for Ajax Cape Town from bbc.co.uk
  Profile
 

1970 births
Living people
South African soccer players
Association football goalkeepers
RKC Waalwijk players
FC Wageningen players
FC Den Bosch players
Netherlands youth international footballers
Directors of football clubs in the Netherlands
SC Heerenveen players
AFC Ajax players
Cape Town Spurs F.C. players
Eredivisie players
Eerste Divisie players
South Africa international soccer players
1998 FIFA World Cup players
2002 FIFA World Cup players
2000 African Cup of Nations players
2002 African Cup of Nations players
South African expatriate soccer players
Expatriate footballers in the Netherlands
South African expatriate sportspeople in the Netherlands
South African people of Dutch descent
Afrikaner people
People from Alberton, Gauteng
Sportspeople from Gauteng
SC Heerenveen non-playing staff